In Beaver Valley is a 1950 American short documentary film directed by James Algar. The film was produced by Walt Disney as part of the True-Life Adventures series of nature documentaries. It won an Oscar in 1951 for Best Short Subject (Two-Reel). At the 1st Berlin International Film Festival it won the Golden Bear (Documentaries) award.

Cast
 Winston Hibler as Narrator

References

External links

1950 films
1950 documentary films
1950 short films
1950s short documentary films
American short documentary films
1950s English-language films
Disney documentary films
Disney short films
Documentary films about nature
Films produced by Walt Disney
Films about rodents
Films scored by Paul Smith (film and television composer)
Golden Bear winners
Live Action Short Film Academy Award winners
RKO Pictures short films
Short films directed by James Algar
1950s American films